Kulaghan-e Dartujan (also Romanized as Kūlaghān-e Dartūjān; also known as Dartūjān, Koolghan, Kūlaqān, and Kūlaqān-e Dartūjān) is a village in Shamil Rural District, Takht District, Bandar Abbas County, Hormozgan Province, Iran. At the 2006 census, its population was 86, in 21 families.

References 

Populated places in Bandar Abbas County